Brandon Maïsano (born 24 June 1993 in Cannes) is a former racing driver from France. He has competed in various third-tier open wheel championships, most notably the GP3 Series and FIA Formula 3 European Championship.

Racing record

Career summary

Complete FIA Formula 3 European Championship results
(key) (Races in bold indicate pole position) (Races in italics indicate fastest lap)

References

External links

 Profile at Driver Database

French racing drivers
1993 births
Living people
French GP3 Series drivers
FIA Formula 3 European Championship drivers
Toyota Racing Series drivers
Sportspeople from Cannes
Prema Powerteam drivers

Formula Abarth drivers
Italian Formula Three Championship drivers
Italian F4 Championship drivers
BVM Racing drivers
BVM Target drivers
M2 Competition drivers
Campos Racing drivers
Karting World Championship drivers